56 Pegasi is a binary star system in the northern constellation of Pegasus. It is visible to the naked eye with a combined apparent visual magnitude of 4.74. The system is approximately 590 light years away from the Sun based on parallax, but is drifting closer with a radial velocity of −28 km/s. It is listed as a member of the Wolf 630 moving group.

The variable radial velocity of this star was announced in 1911 by W. W. Campbell. It is a single-lined spectroscopic binary in an assumed circular orbit with a period of 111.1 days. This value provides a lower bound on the true semimajor axis, which in this case is their actual separation.

This notation indicates it is a K-type giant with some uncertainty about the classification, along with an overabundance of barium and underabundances of the CN and CH radicals. It is an active star, roughly 100 million years old, with 5.4 times the Sun's mass. The star has expanded to 40 times the radius of the Sun and is radiating 680 times the Sun's luminosity from its enlarged photosphere at an effective temperature of 4,416 K.

The system displays an excess of ultraviolet radiation that must be coming from the secondary companion. Simon et al. (1982) classified this object as a subdwarf O star. Alternatively, it may be a white dwarf companion with an accretion disk. Several puzzling features in the evolutionary history of this pair may be explained if the primary is a fast rotator being seen nearly pole-on. The star may have been spun up during a mass transfer episode with the secondary.

References

K-type bright giants
Barium stars
O-type subdwarfs
White dwarfs
Spectroscopic binaries

Pegasus (constellation)
J23070675+2528055
BD+24 4716
Pegasi, 56
218356
114155
8796